Over-Nite Sensation is the ninth studio album by Frank Zappa and The Mothers of Invention, released in September 1973. It was followed by Zappa's solo album Apostrophe (') (1974), which was recorded during the same sessions.

Recording 
Frank Zappa wanted to use backup singers on the songs "I'm the Slime", "Dirty Love", "Zomby Woof", "Dinah-Moe Humm" and "Montana". His road manager suggested The Ikettes, and Ike & Tina Turner were contacted. Ike Turner insisted that Zappa pay the singers, including Tina Turner, no more than $25 per song. However, an invoice shows that they were actually paid $25 per hour, and in total $187.50 each for 7 1/2 hours of service. During the recording sessions at Bolic Sound, Tina brought Ike into the studio to hear the highly difficult middle section of "Montana" which had taken the Ikettes a few days to learn and master. Ike listened to the tape and responded "What is this shit?" before leaving the studio. Ike later insisted that Zappa not credit the Ikettes on the released album.

The recording sessions which produced Over-Nite Sensation also produced Zappa's followup, Apostrophe (') (1974), released as a solo album rather than a Mothers of Invention release.

Music and lyrics 
Much of the album's lyrics deal with sex. For example, "Dinah-Moe Humm" describes a woman who wagers that the narrator can't give her an orgasm and is ultimately aroused by watching him have sex with her sister.

On other topics, "I'm the Slime" criticizes television, and the playful and musically adventurous "Montana" describes moving to Montana to grow dental floss.

The music of Over-Nite Sensation draws from rock, jazz and pop music. "Zomby Woof" has been described as a "heavy metal hybrid of Louis Jordan and Fats Waller".

Artwork
The cover was done by Dave McMacken as somewhat in vein of Salvador Dalí's surreal imagery depicting a two-headed man sitting on a waterbed in a Holiday Inn hotel room surrounded by various objects like a Mothers backstage pass and a television set showing Zappa's face with slime oozing out of it. The entire painting is depicted in a frame showing many sexual acts.

Reception 

The album initially received mixed reviews due to its lyrical content, which some critics found puerile. Rolling Stone magazine disliked the album, describing Zappa as a "spent force", and saying that his best work had been recorded with earlier incarnations of the Mothers. New Musical Express said that the album was "not one of Frank's most outstanding efforts." Robert Christgau gave the album a C, mocking the notion that Zappa's humor underscores serious commentary by asking "where's the serious stuff?"

Later reviews evaluated the album far better, with AllMusic writer Steve Huey writing, "Love it or hate it, Over-Nite Sensation was a watershed album for Frank Zappa, the point where his post-'60s aesthetic was truly established". Kelly Fisher Lowe, in The Words and Music of Frank Zappa, wrote that "Over-Nite and Apostrophe (') are important [...] as a return to Mothers of Invention form and as close to traditional pop albums as Zappa would ever come."

The record was certified gold on November 9, 1976.

Legacy 
Over-Nite Sensation (1973) and Apostrophe (') (1974) are the subject of a Classic Albums series documentary from Eagle Rock Entertainment, released on DVD May 1, 2007.

The lines "She was buns-up kneelin' / Buns up! / I was wheelin an' dealin'" from "Dinah-Moe Humm" are quoted (as "So there she was / buns up and kneelin' / I was wheelin' and a-dealin'") in "Girl Keeps Coming Apart", on Aerosmith's Permanent Vacation.

Track listing

Personnel 
Musicians
 Frank Zappa – guitar, vocals on all tracks except "Fifty-Fifty" and most of "Zomby Woof"
 Kin Vassy – vocals on "I'm the Slime", "Dinah-Moe Humm" and "Montana"
 Ricky Lancelotti – vocals on "Fifty-Fifty" and "Zomby Woof"
 Sal Marquez – trumpet, vocals on "Dinah-Moe Humm"
 Ian Underwood – clarinet, flute, alto saxophone, tenor saxophone
 Bruce Fowler – trombone
 Ruth Underwood – percussion, marimba, vibraphone
 Jean-Luc Ponty – violin, baritone violin
 George Duke – synthesizer, keyboards
 Tom Fowler – bass
 Ralph Humphrey – drums
 Tina Turner and the Ikettes – backing vocals (uncredited) (Tracks 2-3 and 5-7)

Production
Producer: Frank Zappa
Engineers: Fred Borkgren, Steve Desper, Terry Dunavan, Barry Keene, Bob Stone
Remixing: Kerry McNabb
Arranger: Frank Zappa
Technician: Paul Hof
Cover design: Ferenc Dobronyi 
Illustrations: Cover - David B. McMacken, Inside - Cal Schenkel

Charts

Weekly charts

Year-end charts

See also
 Mysterioso Pizzicato

References

1973 albums
Albums produced by Frank Zappa
DiscReet Records albums
The Mothers of Invention albums
Albums recorded at Bolic Sound